The Monument to the Independence of Uzbekistan is a Tashkent monument made in honor of the independence of Uzbekistan. At the top of the monument is a metal sphere ornamented with an ornamental pattern, on which a map of Uzbekistan is depicted. Wreath-laying ceremonies are regularly held at the pedestal of the monument on national holidays and state visits.

History
It was given its current name in the early 1990s, following its renaming from the monument to Vladimir Lenin, which was designed and created in 1974 by Sabir Adylov (1932–2002) and Nikolai Tomsky (1900–1984). In December 2005, during the architectural reconstruction of Mustaqillik Maydoni, the monument was given an additional sculpture, depicting a "Happy Mother" with her baby. By decree of President of Uzbekistan Islam Karimov on February 3, 2006, the newly renovated monument would be renamed to the Monument of Independence and Humanism.

The symbolism of the monument, nicknamed the "globe of Uzbekistan", influenced the monumental art of Uzbekistan in the 1990s–2000s. It was reproduced on posters, murals and sculptures in different Uzbek cities.

Gallery

See also
For similar monuments, see:
 Unisphere (New York City)
 Globe of Peace (Pesaro)
 Eartha (Yarmouth)

For similar attractions in Tashkent, see:
 Shota Rustaveli Street, Tashkent
 Ok Saroy Presidential Palace
 Turkiston Palace
 Monument to the First President of Uzbekistan
 Mustaqillik Maydoni

References 

1974 sculptures
Monuments and memorials in Uzbekistan
Tourist attractions in Tashkent